Johnnie Lee LeMaster (born June 19, 1954) is a former Major League Baseball infielder.  He played for four teams over a 12 year (– and ) MLB career, including 10 seasons with the San Francisco Giants. He batted and threw right-handed.

Career
On September 2, 1975, LeMaster became the third player in major league history to hit an inside-the-park home run in his first at bat, during a 7–3 win over the Dodgers. LeMaster hit only 21 home runs during the rest of his career (3,191 at bats).

LeMaster is remembered for a game in July 1979, when he took the field wearing the phrase on his back that Giants fans often welcomed him with; in place of his last name was the word "BOO".

In 1983, LeMaster amassed over 100 hits for the only time in his career, batting .240 and finishing seventh in the National League with 39 stolen bases while finishing third in the National League with 19 times caught stealing.

During the 1985 season, he played for three teams: the San Francisco Giants, the Cleveland Indians, and the Pittsburgh Pirates; all three teams ended up in last place in their respective divisions.  After retirement, in 1988, he played one season with the Senior Professional Baseball Association, on the Fort Myers Sun Sox. 

LeMaster was a career .222 hitter with 22 home runs and 229 runs batted in in 1039 games.

Personal
LeMaster resides in Paintsville, Kentucky. He is a devout Christian. After his professional baseball career, Johnnie ran Johnnie LeMaster's Sports Center, an athletic store in Paintsville. The store has since been bought and replaced by Hibbett Sports.
LeMaster is a distant cousin of Frank LeMaster, who played football for the University of Kentucky and the Philadelphia Eagles.

From 2016 through his 2019 resignation, LeMaster coached baseball at Paul G. Blazer High School in Ashland, Kentucky.

References

External links 

 Photo of Lemaster wearing the 'Boo' jersey
 UniWatchBlog.com article about LeMaster 2008.01.31

1954 births
Cleveland Indians players
Living people
Baseball players from Ohio
Major League Baseball shortstops
Oakland Athletics players
Pittsburgh Pirates players
San Francisco Giants players
People from Portsmouth, Ohio
Paintsville High School alumni
Hawaii Islanders players
Indianapolis Indians players
Phoenix Giants players
Great Falls Giants players
Decatur Commodores players
Fresno Giants players
Tacoma Tigers players